Anomodon is a genus of mosses in the family Thuidiaceae.

Species
As accepted by GBIF;

References

Hypnales
Moss genera